Clostridium luticellarii is a Gram-positive and strictly anaerobic bacterium from the genus Clostridium which has been isolated from mud from Sichuan in China.

References

 

Bacteria described in 2015
luticellarii